Bravo! is a Brazilian telenovela produced and broadcast by TV Globo. It premiered on 16 June 1975 and ended on 30 January 1976, with a total of 179 episodes. It's the sixteenth "novela das sete" to be aired at the timeslot. It is created by Janete Clair and Gilberto Braga, directed by Fábio Sabag with Reynaldo Boury.

Cast

References

External links 
 

TV Globo telenovelas
1975 telenovelas
Brazilian telenovelas
1975 Brazilian television series debuts
1976 Brazilian television series endings
Portuguese-language telenovelas
Television shows set in Rio de Janeiro (city)